Brian Rose (born May 1971) is an American-born podcaster based in London. He is the host of London Real, a podcast and YouTube channel he founded in 2011.

Early life and career
Rose was born in San Diego, United States, in May 1971. His early career was as a banker in New York City and London. Rose has described how he became addicted to alcohol and then drugs, including a heroin overdose in 2001. He moved to London in 2002 and stopped using drugs, becoming a British citizen in 2007.

Career

In 2011, Rose founded the podcast and YouTube channel London Real. As of 2020, he remains its host and CEO, with the channel having two million subscribers. Guests on the show have included Gary Vaynerchuk and Wim Hof. His most popular video as of 2021 has been with Mantak Chia where they discuss sexual exercises for men.

Rose has also conducted interviews with conspiracy theorist David Icke, in one of which Icke falsely claimed a link between the COVID-19 pandemic and 5G mobile phone networks. The video was later removed from YouTube, Facebook, and Spotify. Rose has said about the interview: "I'm proud we broadcast it. We fought against censorship last year because I want people to have these discussions and I want to have them out in the open... By no means do I agree with everything he says." While interviewing Icke, Rose said, "I personally don't believe the Coronavirus was created by a third party. I do think it occurred naturally. I do believe in the science and I do believe in vaccines". Rose has, however, described the UK government's COVID-19 response as "disproportionate".

Along with London Real, Rose set up an academy offering courses on public speaking, business, and motivation. Vice reported that Rose's "Business Accelerator" programmes have been criticised by past customers. In 2020, the only active company registered in Rose's name was Longstem Limited.

Politics
In the US, Rose originally voted Democratic and then became a Republican. He did not vote in the previous London mayoral (2016) or general (2019) election.

Rose stood in the 2021 London mayoral election and 2021 London Assembly election for his own London Real Party. On 24 January 2021, Rose and six of his staff were fined by police for breaking lockdown rules while filming promotional material for his campaign. He was criticised in the election for his hosting of David Icke on London Real. He finished seventh with 31,111 votes in the mayoral election, while his party finished 11th on the London-wide list with 18,395 votes.

Personal life
Rose is married to Mariana, originally from Bulgaria. She has a daughter from a previous relationship, and they have two sons.

References
  

1971 births
Living people
American YouTubers
American expatriates in the United Kingdom
American podcasters